Samuel Lindley (born July 14, 1973 in Chicago, Illinois), better known by his stage name The Legendary Traxster, is an American songwriter, rapper and record producer. A native of Chicago, he is best known as a producer for Twista, Do or Die and Ludacris. He is the owner of Traxster Inc. and Co-CEO of CWAL Records. In 2017 he launched Nothing But Dope LLC imprint distributed through Priority Records.  He is also one half of the Hip Hop duo House Lindley which is composed of him and his wife Tia London.

Career
The Legendary Traxster produced the song "My Chick Bad" by Ludacris featuring Nicki Minaj, from the album Battle Of The Sexes. Traxster also produced "My Chick Bad" by Ludacris a #1 album on the Billboard 200. He earned a Grammy Nomination for his work with Mariah Carey, co-writing and producing the track, "One and Only" on her 2005 released album, The Emancipation Of Mimi.

In 2009 he reunited with Twista for "Category F5" including the single "Wetter". which. The single went on win to two ASCAP Rhythm & Soul Music Awards" in the Rap and R&B/Hip Hop category. Traxster and Twista also collaborated on "Make a Movie" Twista ft. Chris Brown from Twista's "The Perfect Storm". Traxster produced ten songs on this project.

Traxster participated in the ASCAP SCORES program, leading a songwriting class with kids at Chalmers Elementary School in Chicago on December 1 and 8, 2010. Traxster and the students recorded the song at Chicago Recording Company studios on December 14, 2010, with the finished track included on a compilation CD produced by ASCAP and distributed to music industry decision makers and each of the schools involved.

A native of Chicago, he is best known as producer for the platinum-selling rapper Twista and the famed rap group Do or Die, for whom he produced several albums including the platinum-selling Picture This. Traxster also produced Twista's Platinum selling Adrenaline Rush in its entirety. He has also produced for Chris Brown, Waka Flocka Flame, Yo Gotti, Ray J, R. Kelly, T.I., Lil Boosie, Cam'ron, Scarface, Bun B, Mystikal, E-40, WC, C-Bo, Static Major, Tech N9ne, The Outlawz, Raekwon, Shawnna, Eve and Trina.

In January 2017 Traxster signed a deal with Priority Records for his label Nothing But Dope LLC. The new Priority Records launched in 2013. The label's re-launch was a venture by Capitol Records, which is owned by the Universal Music Group.

Personal life

In 2015 he married singer-songwriter Tia London and has one child together Akai King Lindley who was born in July 2015.

Artist Discography
2001: All Hell Breaks Loose
2008: The Return of Gangsta Music
2013: You Owe Me A Favor (Beat Tape)
2015: You Owe Me Another Favor (Beat Tape)
2016: "Black Saints"

Production Discography

2023

Beyoncé -         Cuff It (Wetter Remix)

2014

Twista -          Dark Horse -          "The Dark Horse" Featuring Tyme

Twista -          Dark Horse -          "I Am Sucha Mobsta"

Twista -          Dark Horse -          "It's Yours" Featuring Tia London

Twista -          Dark Horse -          "Nothing Like Me" Featuring Gritz

Twista -          Dark Horse -          "Me And You"

2013

Java Starr -       Troubled Waters -                    "Peakin" Featuring Dollarmentary

Java Starr -       Troubled Waters -                    "Gotta Do Better" Featuring Jack Freeman

Java Starr -       Troubled Waters -                    "My City" Featuring Scarface

Java Starr -       Troubled Waters -                    "What's Pop'n" Featuring Twista

Java Starr -       Troubled Waters -                    "Champion" Featuring Siren The Goddess

Java Starr -       Troubled Waters -                    "Dreamer" Featuring Tia London

Java Starr -       Troubled Waters -                    "Let Me In" Featuring Darilyn Monroe

Java Starr -       Troubled Waters -                    "Lost" Featuring Twista & Yukmouth

Java Starr -       Troubled Waters -                    "See Me" Featuring Green Giant

Java Starr -       Troubled Waters -                    "Pop A Crate" Featuring Lyru & Green Giant

Java Starr -       Troubled Waters -                    "Smoke"

Twista -          Back to the Basics (EP) -          "Intro/Freestyle"

Twista -          Back to the Basics (EP) -          "Ferocious"

Twista -          Back to the Basics (EP) -          "Put It Down"

Down"

2012

Tia London -          The Overdose (Album)

2011

Tia London -          Love Junkie (Album)

Big Sean -          Finally Famous -          "I Do It"

2010

Ludacris -          Battle of the Sexes -          "My Chick Bad" Featuring Nicki Minaj

Ludacris -          Battle of the Sexes -          "My Chick Bad (Remix)" Featuring Diamond, Trina and Eve

Twista -          The Perfect Storm -          "Darkness" Featuring DaWreck of Triple Darkness

Twista -          The Perfect Storm -          "Make a Movie" Featuring Chris Brown

Twista -          The Perfect Storm -          "I Do"

Twista -          The Perfect Storm -          "2012" Featuring Tia London

Twista -          The Perfect Storm -          "Back To The Basics"

Twista -          The Perfect Storm -          "Hands Up, Lay Down" Featuring Waka Flocka Flame

Twista -          The Perfect Storm -          "Call The Police" Featuring Ray J

Twista -          The Perfect Storm -          "Give It To Me" Featuring Teala Chenae

Twista -          The Perfect Storm -          "Go" Featuring Zamica

Twista -          The Perfect Storm -          "The Heat" Featuring Raekwon

2009

Twista -          Category F5 -          "Misunderstood" Featuring Buk

Twista -          Category F5 -          "Fire"  Featuring Lil Boosie

Twista -          Category F5 -          "Yellow Light" Featuring R. Kelly

Twista -          Category F5 -          "Wetter" Featuring Erika Shevon

Twista -          Category F5 -           "Yo Body" Featuring Do or Die & Johnny P.

Twista -          Category F5 -          "Gotta Get Me One" Featuring Static Major

2007

WC -          Guilty by Affiliation -          "Side Dick"

2006

Do or Die -          Get That Paper -          "Get Yo Gunz"

Do or Die -          Get That Paper -          "t Ain't Hard"

Do or Die -          Get That Paper -          "On My Own""

Do or Die -          Get That Paper -          "Get This Paper"

Do or Die -          Get That Paper -          "Somethin' Like a Playa"

Do or Die -          Get That Paper -          "Street Sh$"

Do or Die -          Get That Paper -          "Up That Scratch"

Tech N9ne -          Everready (The Religion) -          "My World" Featuring Brotha Lynch Hung & Dalima

2005

Mariah Carey -          The Emancipation of Mimi -           "One and Only" Featuring Twista

Do or Die -          D.O.D. -          "Against All Odds"

Do or Die -          D.O.D. -          "Chain of Command"

Do or Die -          D.O.D. -          "Around Here" Featuring Malik Yusef

Do or Die -          D.O.D. -          "Wa da da Dang" Featuring Grind

Do or Die -          D.O.D. -          "Getcha Weight Up"

Do or Die -          D.O.D. -          "For My N***az" Featuring The Legendary Traxster

2004

Twista -           Kamikaze -          "Like a 24" Featuring T.I. & Liffy Stokes

Cam'ron -          Purple Haze -          "Chi (Skit)/Adrenaline/Phone (Skit)" Featuring Twista & Yung Buk of Psycho Drama

2003

Do or Die -          Pimpin' Ain't Dead -           "One More Way 2 Die" Featuring E.C. Illa

Do or Die -          Pimpin' Ain't Dead -           "Do U?" Featuring Twista And Johnny P.

Do or Die -          Pimpin' Ain't Dead -           "Fantasy"

Do or Die -          Pimpin' Ain't Dead -           "See It Through Reality" Featuring The Legendary Traxster

Do or Die -          Pimpin' Ain't Dead -           "Lil' Ghetto Boy" Featuring Johnny P.

Do or Die -          Pimpin' Ain't Dead -           "Stateville" Featuring The Legendary Traxster And Dun D

Do or Die -          Pimpin' Ain't Dead -           "Don't Give No F*ck (No Love 2K3"

Do or Die -          Pimpin' Ain't Dead -           "Bomb on Contact"

Do or Die -          Pimpin' Ain't Dead -           "Not 4 U" Featuring Johnny P.

Do or Die -          Pimpin' Ain't Dead -           "Who I Fuck Wit"

Do or Die -          Pimpin' Ain't Dead -           "Cold World"

2002

Do or Die -          Back 2 the Game -           "Ain't No Punk"

Do or Die -          Back 2 the Game -           "I Got A Problem" Featuring Yung Buk

Do or Die -          Back 2 the Game -           "3 A.M." Featuring Johnny P.

Do or Die -          Back 2 the Game -           "Secret Indictment"

Do or Die -          Back 2 the Game -           "Dead Homies" Featuring Johnny P.

Do or Die -          Back 2 the Game -           "That's My Car"

Do or Die -          Back 2 the Game -           "Menage A Trois" Featuring Johnny P.

2001

Snypaz -          Livin' in the Scope -           "Searchin"

1999

Mystikal -          The Corruptor (soundtrack) -          "I Ain't Playin"

1998

Do or Die -          Caught Up (soundtrack) -          "All in the Club" Featuring Danny Boy And Johnny P

Do or Die -          Headz or Tailz -          "Lil Sum Sum"

Do or Die -          Headz or Tailz -          "Nobody's Home" Featuring Johnny P. and Danny Boy

Do or Die -         Headz or Tailz -          "All in the Club" Featuring Danny Boy

Do or Die -          Headz or Tailz -          "Can I" Featuring Beyond Content

Do or Die -          Headz or Tailz -          "Gangsta Shit" Featuring Shock The World

Do or Die -          Headz or Tailz -          "Bustin Back (Bone Thugs-n-Harmony Diss)" Featuring Lil Chilla Of Snypaz

Do or Die -          Headz or Tailz -          "Who Am I" Featuring Scarface

Do or Die -          Headz or Tailz -          "Caine House"

Twista And The Speedknot Mobstaz -          Mobstability -          "Intro"

Twista And The Speedknot Mobstaz -          Mobstability -          "Crook County (Bone Thugs-n-Harmony Diss)" Featuring Newsense

Twista And The Speedknot Mobstaz -          Mobstability -          "Mob Up"

Twista And The Speedknot Mobstaz -          Mobstability -          "Front Porch" Featuring Danny Boy

Twista And The Speedknot Mobstaz -          Mobstability -          "In Your World" Featuring Christopher Williams

Twista And The Speedknot Mobstaz -          Mobstability -          "Legit Ballers"

Twista And The Speedknot Mobstaz -          Mobstability -          "Mobstability"

Twista And The Speedknot Mobstaz -          Mobstability -          "Party Hoes"

Twista And The Speedknot Mobstaz -          Mobstability -          "Warm Embrace"

Twista And The Speedknot Mobstaz -          Mobstability -         "Smoke Wit You" Featuring Baby Boy

Twista And The Speedknot Mobstaz -          Mobstability -          "Loyalty" Featuring Shock The World

Twista And The Speedknot Mobstaz -          Mobstability -          "Motive 4 Murder"

Twista And The Speedknot Mobstaz -          Mobstability -          "Dreams"

Twista And The Speedknot Mobstaz -          Mobstability -          "Rock Y'all Spot"

Twista And The Speedknot Mobstaz -          Dr. Dolittle Soundtrack -          "In Your World"

Latanya -          The Big Hit Soundtrack -          "What U On"

1997

Mystikal -          Dangerous Ground (soundtrack) -          "Mr. Shit Talker"

Twista -          Adrenaline Rush -          "Intro"

Twista -          Adrenaline Rush -          "Adrenaline Rush" Featuring Yung Buk of Psycho Drama

Twista -          Adrenaline Rush -          "Death Before Dishonor"

Twista -          Adrenaline Rush -          "It Feels So Good" Featuring Ms. Kane aka Eryka Kane

Twista -          Adrenaline Rush -          "Overdose"

Twista -          Adrenaline Rush -          "Mobster's Anthem" Featuring Liffy Stokes, Mayz

Twista -          Adrenaline Rush -          "Get Her In Tha Mood" (skit)

Twista -          Adrenaline Rush -          "Emotions" Featuring Johnny P

Twista -          Adrenaline Rush -          "Unsolved Mystery"

Twista -          Adrenaline Rush -          "Korrupt World" Featuring B-Hype

Twista -          Adrenaline Rush -          "Get It Wet" Featuring Ms Kane aka Eryka Kane

Twista -          Adrenaline Rush -          "No Remorse" Featuring Liffy Stokes, B-Hype, Turtle Banks, Mayz & Master Link of Qualo

Twista -          Adrenaline Rush -          "Emotions" (Remix)

Mystikal -         Unpredictable -          "Still Smokin"

Mic Geronimo -         Vendetta -          "Vendetta"

1996

Do or Die -          Picture This -          "Alpha and Omega"

Do or Die -          Picture This -          "Shut 'Em Down"

Do or Die -          Picture This -          "Po Pimp" Featuring Twista And Johnny P.

Do or Die -          Picture This -          "Playa Like Me and You" Featuring Johnny P.

Do or Die -          Picture This -          "Promise"

Do or Die -          Picture This -          "6 Million"

Do or Die -          Picture This -          "Search Warrant"

Do or Die -          Picture This -          "Anotha One Dead And Gone"

External links 
 
Fake Shore Drive Interview
iStandard iSitdown w/ The Legendary Traxster

1973 births
Living people
African-American male rappers
Record producers from Illinois
Hip hop record producers
Rappers from Chicago
21st-century African-American musicians
21st-century American rappers